The discography of jazz/jazz fusion drummer Billy Cobham includes solo, collaborative, and work playing on other artists' albums.

Discography

As leader

 Spectrum (1973) 
 Crosswinds (1974)
 Total Eclipse (1974)  
 Shabazz [live] (1974)  
 A Funky Thide of Sings (1975)  
 Life & Times (1976) 
 The Billy Cobham–George Duke Band: "Live" on Tour in Europe (1976)  
 Magic (1977) 
 Alivemutherforya [live] with Steve Khan, Alphonso Johnson and Tom Scott (1978)
 Inner Conflicts (1978)  
 Simplicity of Expression: Depth of Thought (1978)  
 B.C. (1979)
 Live: Flight Time [live] (1980)  
 Stratus (1981)  
 Observations & Reflections (Elektra/Musician, 1982)  
 Billy Cobham's Glass Menagerie: Smokin’ [live] (Elektra/Musician, 1982)
 Warning (1985)  
 Consortium with Johannes Faber (1985)
 Power Play (1986) 
 Best Of (1987)
 Picture This (1987)
 Incoming (1989) 
 No Filters w/Wolfgang Schmid (1990)
 By Design (1992)
 The Traveler (1994) 
 Nordic (1996) 
 Paradox (1996)
 Paradox, The First Second [live] (1998)
 Mississippi Nights Live [live] (1998)
 Focused (1999)  
 Ensemble New Hope Street (1999) 
 Nordic: Off Color (1999)
 North by NorthWest (2001) 
 Drum 'n' Voice (2002) 
 The Art of Three [live] (2002) 
 Many Years B.C. [compilation] (2002)
 Culture Mix (2002)
 The Art of Five (2004)
 Caravaggio w/Massimo Colombo (2005)
 Art of Four [live] (2006)
 Drum 'n' Voice 2 (2006)
 Fruit from the Loom (2007)
 De Cuba y de Panama with Asere (2008)
 Palindrome (2010)
 Drum 'n' Voice 3 (Spring 2010)
 Tales From The Skeleton Coast (2014)
 Spectrum 40 Live (2015)
 Compass Point  (2013)
 Drum 'n' Voice 4 (2016)
 Broad Horizon with Frankfurt Radio Big Band  (2016)

As sideman

With Stanley Turrentine

 Sugar (CTI, 1970)

With Stanley Turrentine and Milt Jackson

 Cherry (CTI, 1972)

With Mose Allison
 Western Man (Atlantic, 1971)
 Lessons in Living (1982)

With Gene Ammons
 Got My Own (Prestige, 1972)
 Big Bad Jug (Prestige, 1973)

With Ray Barretto
 The Other Road (1973)

With George Benson
 Giblet Gravy (1968) 
 White Rabbit (CTI, 1972)

With Bobby and the Midnites
 Bobby and the Midnites (1981)
 Where the Beat Meets the Street (1984)

With The Brothers Johnson
 Look Out for #1 (1976)

With James Brown
 Make It Funky: The Big Payback 1971-1975 (1996)

With Kenny Burrell
 Night Song (Verve, 1969)
 God Bless the Child (CTI, 1971)

With Cargo
 Cargo (1982)

With Ron Carter
Uptown Conversation (Embryo, 1970)
 Blues Farm (CTI, 1973)
 All Blues (CTI, 1973)
 Spanish Blue (CTI, 1974)
 Yellow & Green (CTI, 1976)
 New York Slick (Milestone, 1980)
 Empire Jazz (RSO, 1980)
With Stanley Clarke
 School Days (1976)
 Atlantis with George Duke (1973)
 Live at the Greek with Larry Carlton (1993)

With Larry Coryell
 Spaces (1974)
 The Essential Larry Coryell (1975)
 Spaces Revisited (1997)

With Miles Davis
 Bitches Brew (1970)
 Live-Evil (1970)
 A Tribute to Jack Johnson (1970)
 Big Fun (1974)
 Get Up with It (1974)
 Circle in the Round (1979) 
 Directions (recorded 11.3.1960-27.2.1970, released 1980)

With Richard Davis
Way Out West (recorded 1977, Muse, 1980)
Fancy Free (Galaxy, 1977)

With Eumir Deodato
 Prelude (1972)
 Deodato 2 (1973)
 Whirlwinds (1974)

With Dreams
 Dreams (1970)
 Imagine My Surprise (1971)

With Charles Earland
Intensity (Prestige, 1972)

With Gil Evans
Live at the Public Theater (New York 1980) (Trio, 1981)

With Fania All Stars
 Our Latin Thing (1972)
 Latin-Soul-Rock (1974)

With Roberta Flack and Donny Hathaway
 Roberta Flack & Donny Hathaway (1980)

With Peter Gabriel
 Passion: Music for The Last Temptation of Christ (1989)

With Johnny Hammond
Breakout (Kudu, 1971)
 Wild Horses Rock Steady (Kudu, 1971)
The Prophet (Kudu, 1972)
With Billy Harper
Capra Black (Strata-East, 1973)

With Donald Harrison
 Heroes (Nagel Heyer, 2004)

With Freddie Hubbard
 Sky Dive (CTI, 1973)

With Jackie and Roy
 Time & Love (CTI, 1972)

With Milt Jackson
 Sunflower (CTI, 1972)

With Jazz Is Dead
 Blue Light Rain (1998)

With Quincy Jones
 The Anderson Tapes (1971)
 I Heard That!! (1976)
With Robin Kenyatta 
Gypsy Man (Atlantic, 1973)
With Hubert Laws
 Morning Star (CTI, 1972)
 Carnegie Hall (CTI, 1973)

With Mahavishnu Orchestra
 Inner Mounting Flame (1971)
 Birds of Fire (1973)
 Between Nothingness and Eternity (1973)
 The Lost Trident Sessions (recorded 1973, released 1999)
 Mahavishnu (1984)

With Junior Mance
 With a Lotta Help from My Friends (Atlantic, 1970)

With Arif Mardin
Journey (Atlantic, 1974)

With Les McCann
Comment (Atlantic, 1970)
 Invitation to Openness (Atlantic, 1971)

With John McLaughlin
 My Goal's Beyond (Columbia, 1971)
 Love Devotion Surrender with Carlos Santana (Columbia, 1973)
 Electric Guitarist (Columbia, 1978)

With Mark-Almond Band
 Rising (1972)
 To the Heart (1976)
With Jimmy Owens
Headin' Home (A&M/Horizon, 1978)
With Sonny Rollins
 The Way I Feel (Milestone, 1976)
 Don’t Stop the Carnival (Milestone, 1978)

With Michel Sardaby
Michel Sardaby in New York (Sound Hills, 2002)

With Don Sebesky
 Giant Box (CTI, 1973)

With Horace Silver
 Serenade to a Soul Sister (1968)
 You Gotta Take a Little Love (1969)

With Carly Simon
 Hotcakes (1974)
With Lonnie Smith
Mama Wailer (Kudu, 1971)
With Gábor Szabó
 Mizrab (CTI, 1972)
With Leon Thomas
The Leon Thomas Album (Flying Dutchman, 1970)
With McCoy Tyner
 Fly with the Wind (Milestone, 1976)

With Miroslav Vitous
 Purple (1970)

With Grover Washington, Jr.
 All the King's Horses (Kudu, 1972)
 Soul Box (Kudu, 1973)

With Randy Weston
 Blue Moses (CTI, 1972)

External links
 Album details of all Billy Cobham Albums

Jazz discographies
Discographies of American artists